The 1958–59 season was the 44th in the history of the Isthmian League, an English football competition.

Wimbledon were champions, winning their fifth Isthmian League title. At the end of the season Romford switched to the Southern Football League.

League table

References

Isthmian League seasons
I